Armaghan-i-Hijaz (or The Gift of the Hijaz; originally published in Persian, 1938) was a philosophical poetry book of Allama Iqbal, the great poet-philosopher of Islam.

Introduction

This work, published a few months after the poet's death, is a fairly small volume containing verses in both Persian and Urdu. It is incomplete, although this is not readily apparent to the reader; for Iqbal left some gaps in the book which he intended to fill when he made the pilgrimage to Mecca. The title means "Gift from the Hijaz." He had long wished to undertake the journey to the Arabian Peninsula to perform the Hajj and to visit the tomb of Muhammad, but was prevented from doing so by continuous illness during the last years of his life. Iqbal began composing the Armaghan as a gift to take to the Hijaz, intending to publish it on his return to India as a "Gift from the Hijaz" to his countrymen.

In this, his last work, we find the poet more withdrawn and introspective than previously. The poems are shorter and more personal. The impression left is that the author is taking a last look at the world around him before leaving it behind. The themes are largely the familiar ones, but the treatment is as fresh, forceful and delicate as ever. Iqbal's outspokenness, even when addressing God, in criticizing human evils and in his hatred of injustice and oppression and his devotion to Muhammad and his companions, all remain undiminished. As a summing-up of the ideas and feelings of a great thinker, the Armaghan merits a special place among the literary classics of the twentieth century.

It is divided into two parts, the first containing Persian, the second Urdu poems. The Persian verses, all in ruba'i form, are divided into five groups and presents God the Truth, Muhammad, the Muslim nation, Mankind and the "Companions on the Path to God."

The second part comprises Urdu poems composed between 1935 and the time of his death and include a poem describing the ideological confusion of the poet's time and its impact on Muslims.

In this work, Iqbal touches on practically every question with which he had been preoccupied during his life of intellectual striving and literary achievement. The poems which comprise this final work give the impression that the writer has at last found the tranquility he had for so long sought:

The song that has gone may come again - or may not.
A fresh breeze may come from Hijaz - or may not.
The days of this poor humble man are ended;
Another knower of secrets may come - or may not.

Topics

Preface
HAZOOR-I-HAQ
I
They held the loveless is heart and went away
My being and non-being were topics on tips
My heart rakes often knots of 'how' and 'why'
What a noisy display of mud and clay
Who brought the wide world on the cosmos scene
II
My heart not prisoned is writhing with pain
O Amrine, thou hast turn'd the cup of wine
The self writhing hearts are captives of lures
I tread a path there which leads no where
Keep off my wine from shallow hearted meeks
Thou hast no quest in thy efforts and zeals
Bid me shake the world with a cry and hue
A gloom still lurking in broad day light
Thy slave I'm and seek thy pleasure alone
III
My heart knows not the bliss of His flame
How to tell tale of 'Deen' and father land
A Muslim tied up with a foreign land
I wish not this world nor cosmos whole
What ye hopes from an easy going bloke
IV
I seek for that nation a rising field
How long shall you gaze with a wrathful stare?
That bliss of the past may come or not
If so e'er comes that gifted mystic sage
My heart is wealth mine who knows pang's pine
V
To lose heart to some one he did not know
My heart so restive is fleeing from me
I donned big circles on a likewise night
Knows not the Gabriel this hue and cry
The sky seldom sees alike this age
VI
Get me Seenay's truth, and love of his name
VII
A Muslim gloats in hunger and patches
A nation again whom duty is dear
A nation again whose hearts would adorn
VIII
Thy world is ruled by misers few
A hungry seeker begged his Sheikh to plead
IX
Looking in a mess is Indian State
From bondage a Moslem is a self sold guy
X
So calculate once all the losses and gains
What is the lasting life is known to thee
XI
When the old world gets its apex of height
My body is tired but soul still flies
HAZOOR-I-RISALAT
I
O, tent chamberlain! leave the tent hark
I keep my eyes penchant on hearts essence
I know not who dazzled and killed this heart
Ask not of lustre drunk's caravan scene
I cherish for Yasrib though I am old
II
To love'an rapture sins gave a common sense
You ask the spots where I played my jazz there
III
That dawn I asked naqah not to run quick
She needs no reins O I teamster hence!
Yet tears moist vivid in jet black eyes
IV
How lucky are deserts caravan lines
Hail the desert whose eve is morning gay
V
Who's that Ajmi as head of caravan
A place in love and raptures was his aim
VI
A hidden grief untold is clear
In pits grow poppies from vernal tide
VII
A page of Iraqi sometimes I turn
Let the hiker's grief take a blissful turn
VIII
Come O! chum for a tie to weep and cry
To wise he gave less wealth and affluence
The world with four sides I have in arm-pit
In this valley lies a lasting life new
IX
A Muslim was a king and saint so high
The heart takes heat from thy love pangs' flame
No morn yet to slaves O Indian night
As such I say to a. soft-hearted soul
A friend's hidden life how can I reveal
The sky still going on a perverse course
In his pure blood shines not that vigour and heat
He made his heart captive of pomp and show
To him the heart's door is not open yet
X
His collar is torn, he cares no darn
Give him his dues, of a captive and meek
Refine his morals and life once more
The bride of life, in him is not his own
His eyes are void of a glamour and glee
Though born as Muslim yet knows not the death
XI
The kingship as whole is trick and skill
A Muslim's stuff has a lifelong stay
Ashamed is Muslim for losing his State
Ask me not of his present day lot
I have scanned the whole world through his eye
The Muslims have raised no armament wings
The assets of Sheikh were the fables old
He brought a total change in faithless world
From fane gets Harem its grandeur and glare
As long in mosque the poor kept a row
The Moslems are fighting with brothers own
To others than God we touch our brows
In the hands of drinkers the empty glass
The synagogues bottles are void of wine
The Muslims are foreigns on every land
With wings you gave I judge and fly
At night before Lord I often cry
I speak not now of the grandeur past
The guard of Harem is the mason of fane
From this poor man's flame, sitting on his way
Like gallants I fall and rise again
Let me sob and sigh in a lone retreat
I fly in the airy lovelier space
Of secret I'told, they paid no heed
To stick it to bosom this verse aims not
You bid me for a theme on bliss lifelong
My face looks saffron from arcane pain
The meek utter hence of yonder glance
Those who knew not I preached them ego
What I hold in heart is grief and remorse
A poor, ruthfull flutist who taught love's tone
I seek not my vigour from morning air
I'am in a sea which has no coast side
Drive not from door who are longing for thee
On idols white my heart is sweet
From Western taverns the wines I take
I seek from thy door, whatever I seek
With 'mullah' or 'Sufi' I do not sit
The 'mullah' never knows the pangs of grief
On pulpit his address a venom of bile
The heart of lucent hearts he took or I?
An alien I am within my own race
For any one's boon this heart owes not
My craze still feels the same burning phase
This dust still feels His living flame
My glance looks not the world's hollow game
I have been born in a flameless age
The 'rose and poppy' lack my 'scent and shade.
So alien I am in West and East
I broke the magic of the modern age
You have lit up my eyes with an insight
When I pressed myself in my own embrace
The world has charms like paradise true
Bid him O lord! a holy man's lead
Move around O bearer! the wine cup's course
For love the world came from thee the love's flame
To me this burning a boon of thy glow
This heart, I tied not with aught in this fane
Grow that poppy from the dust of mine
To my shining race I would love to groan
For the sake of truth of my free lance tone
I hold a heart in hand find not a beau
Like Rumi I raised His call in Harem whole
Raise a garden new from dust of mine
A Muslim is resting from coast to coast
Who told him I smell thee 'under the rose'
From thy own main give pearls to my rill
In a gathering see my flute's tones sweet
I kept beaming face in this or that case
I have shared the poppy's flame and pain
With thy light alone I lit up my glance
I need in thy land just a melting sigh
XII
I hold very dear that roaring roar
Look to these saucy Anglican maids
Give a helping hand to those who are weak
XIII
You too take the wine from friend's cup warm
A poor man I'm, you hold the 'Arab's reign
A look of pain I'm and see no cure quick
Let tis join hands to spread his love's flame
You hold a high place in the desert's land
Being Muslims we make no home and false ties
To Anglian idols pay not a heed
HAZOOR-I-MILLAT
I
AN ODE TO UMMAH
Be nearer to the aim like a moon new
My self's own sea gave a rise to me
Come O' bearer and move the cup of Wine
Come O' bearer and raise the veils aside
Raise from thy bosom a 'Call of God Great'
From self a Muslim is man perfect
As long the Muslim, in self can peep,
The veils of thy fortune lo! I ope
Now all the shut doors for Turks are ope
A nation whose spring falls to decay
God gave that nation a sway o'er lands
From Razi thus learn the Quran's insight
II
EGO
Who makes Ego firm by 'Lailah's tie
O ignorant man get a knowing heart
Thy heart keeps not that hidden scar
III
ANAL HAQ (I AM GOD)
A place of I am God is God's own place
I am the God suits to that nation lone
Among nations large she holds a place great
From her inner verve that race is a flame
Like a unique race thus She flies in space
In garden's lawn he is song bird sweet
Fill the old wine in the New Age bowl
IV
SUFI AND MULLAH
The Mullah and Sufi are cross in deed
When the English subdued the mosque and fane
To Mullah and Sufi thou art a slave
Through the mirror of Quran see thy deeds
I salute the Mullah and Sufi old
On hell kafir-maker MulIah spoke
A well read disciple asked his guide
Thus spoke to his son a guide in patched robe
V
RUMI
Pour in thy self that old wine again
Take from his cup those poppy like stems
From his verve and heat I got a good share
Being full of pathos and passion's heat
He solved many ties I had to face
To me his heart's door was always ope
His thought thus flies with stars and moon rays
Take secrets of content from Rumi's call
When self is deprived from godly tint
That bright wine scattered from my wineyard
VI
THE MESSAGE OF FAROOQ (HAZRAT UMAR)
O desert's breeze rise from 'Arab's sky
Tue Faqr and Caliphate with King's Crown shine
A young man who peeps in his ego deep
For sense and heart's sake leave each door ajar
How happy is the race who wins her goal
That Turkish seaman how sang a song gay
The world rule is destined to my own dust
To certitude truth who so ever knew
A Muslim who tested his own ego first

VII
TO THE ARAB POET
To Arab poets sweet on my part say
I caused in his soul a verve a heat
You leave making now the portraits on wall
My heart has a grief, and dust has a heart
Of virtues of God Muslim has a part
Give to his dust that flame and might
A Muslim you were named for grief's bargain
On whom were opened the secrets of soul
So guard the nature of thy mud and dust
The hill and desert night defies thy day
Read the clear writing on thy forehead's slate
VIII
O SON OF THE DESERT
When all the desert sides were bright from dawn
The Truth chose Arab for caravan's lead
Those nights had the uproar for future's dawn
IX
FROM THIS DUST A RIDER COMES
DO YOU KNOW?
Learn the ways to win His pleasure and grace
If a craze consumes the garden's face
The poppy of my dawn's first vernal tide
So scattered I'm like dust of the way
How lucky a nation whom wheel of fate
In self's own sea, I'm thus a restive' wave
His glance would fill up the empty bowl
The caravans reins he would take when
To that holy mother I greet with pride
My heart thus says that the hero will hail
X
THE CALIPHATE AND MONARCHY
The Arabs gained a lot from Prophet's light
Take the Caliphate's witness with a heed
A Moses grapples with kingdoms all
The Adam is slave in this world yet
The love, from his glance is stable and best
XI
TURKS OF OTTOMAN EMPIRE
In the Ottoman reign, the Turks are free
How daring were they who broke his charms
The fate thus gave to Turks a verve anew
XII
TO DAUGHTERS OF THE NATION
Learn O' daughterling this loveliness trend
A God given sword thy glance to thee
At last modern age shows her conscience lo!
The world is stable from the mother's grace
That nation is lucky in whose hard race
This craze she gave me for sharp wits sense
If you pay a heed once, to this poor guy
From my evening's dusk get a dawn new
XIII
THE MODERN AGE
What is the age? On whom the faith cries
His glance only paints the heathen's shade
To youths of this age he taught evil ways
The Muslim draws content and kingship close
The dance you now play in this or that way
XIV
BRAHMEN
For him, he opened hundred doors for plots
To Brahmen I say not a useless bloke
A pundit keeps eyes on his own task
The Brahmen said leave this white man's door
XV
EDUCATION
A shine which lasts with beauty and grace
A knowledge which cures but melts not to trance
No links with that Momin the God would keep
A blind eye is better from eyes crook
No use of a thought which measures sky
Respect is the dress of a sage or fool
Why you lose hopes of kids a bit
Teach the offspring wisdom and faith's ken
Who sapp'd sweet tone of the birds and buds
The days of that 'Dervesh' O God keep gay
Who e'er tied himself with Lailah's tie
A caravan was killed, if you e'er see
A well dressed fighter and handsome guy
To a camel addressed its youngest foal
XVI
SEARCH FOR FOOD AND LIVING
If the hawks too fly for roof to roof race
See thy own self with a seeing eye
XVII
A CROCODILE TO ITS YOUNG
Thus said to its child a 'croco' with boast
In sea you are not it lies but in thee
XVIII
THE FINIS
I talk not of bearer nor of bowl hence
Back to ego turn, and back to heart look
For heart and eyes course, the ‘Harem’ is the aim
A MESSAGE TO MANKIND
Introduction
I
O bearer come and serve the old wine
Leave thy solitude cell for a while please
II
With times came unrest which passed so quick
Those who had fears for the future days
III
Like nightingale you know not the groans and wails
Come forward and learn the self seeing art
Give up the habit to weep on fate
A gull said to shaver, nice witty thing
You had fallen then from a godly place
I hail that day when he turns to self's bold
Like me you are too wrapped in a veil
A camel once said a nice word to foal
IV
I know many savants and gems of west
Hark! O victim of wits of aliens few
V
This being would last or just a passing show
With battle axe smite the Bistoon Mountain
Keep the crave's lamp burning ever in heart
O heart's sea! no peace yet known to thee
To both the worlds win with efforts and zeal
You show us O Poppy! thy self's own trace
VI
A man weeps not from a grief or pains
If a tested man dies think not ever
If thy dust has no link with soul and heart
My each breath blows with griefs many more
A young who tied heart with ego's call
Such griefs this heart now likes to take
Blame not the God for this or that hurt
Turn out fire of envy from thy heart's core
In his nights behold many dawns bright
VII
To the morning breeze' weep'd the dew' in trance
VIII
HEART
The heart is a sea which likes no shore
My heart is a fire, a smoke my frame
His help the world seeks like his slave own
The Ego's power he did not try
You say the heart is the Khak and Khoon
The world of Sun and Moon, slave of his thread
We are God's harvest its yield is heart
To that rare beauty my heart seeks again
The heart's world is not world of pomp and show
The glance brought eyes and wisdom a tape band
What is the love? an impact of glance
IX
EGO
The Ego is lucent from God's light rays
When a nation gives up gossip's course
From God's own being, the 'self' got a 'being' so
The friendship of rose a heart likes when
His parting's prick in my tête-à-tête lies
The dusty look I hold owes to His door
X
COMPULSION AND OPTION
I am quite certain that on the doomsday
In city of Room a pontiff told me
XI
DEATH
The death once said to God in this way
To king of six nooks give a lasting soul
XII
SAY TO SATAN
From me please give to Satan a message
As long He made not this wide world anew
The separation gave to zeal great spur
He drove thee out from the Heavens first
My rights and the wrongs you already know
Let us play a chess like a royal game
XIII
EARTH'S SATAN AND HELL'S SATAN
From this world's clear violence the man is sick
Look the demons dash on ear and eyelash
What a devil who likes a backward gait
What a venomed wine he holds in his bowl
Yet the man lies fallen from the high place
To Satans of this age be not a prey
His blows counterpart is a man complete
To sense of the means it is far off though
TO FRIENDS OF COMMON CREED (SAME PATH)
I
The Qalandar is a bold hawk of sky
When the Allah Hoo's tick did hit my soul
In the heart of nature like tears I groan
In logic I feel a smell of raws
Come and take from me that old wine's bowl
The same old harp I hold in my hand
To tyrants of this age I would thus say
A poor I am whose asset is glance
My heart's door I shut not to any one
No pomp and show I have in this globe
Some points were discussed by hundred wise men
The science or art points I claim not to wield
I boast not to be a song bird of dawn
This world is a path to my eyes and sense
With nothingness learn to live with grace
For long I'm gaining from this dusty mart
You cant learn aught 'sans' a conscious soul
Get a self-knowing eye and see thy soul
The wisdom knows not the certitude eyes
What are the clothes, gold jewels and gems?
To self my wine gives full sense and poise
For robes and turbans why you feel a bent
As soon I espied my ego's essence
When I packed my self from this dusty fuss
II
If a wise man holds clean conscience and soul
III
You are bowing head to 'Dara' and 'Jam'
I heard a nice verse from a man old
The being's secret hids in two words of sage
The being's secret hids in two words of sage
Two worlds of old man I keep in mind still
A restive wave said once to a coast
If this pomp and show the Anglian boon
To Anglians thus the hearts do not own
IV
We are despaired of heart and faith's way
His path's true sign if a Muslim could know
O callous heart make not a link with clay
In Truth and certitude lies the love's place
For Muslim 'this is the gnosis and ken
You handed over thee to idols white
A self maker and melter each cant be
A Momin burns thus in his being's own heat
What is lovers s service, prayers of beaus?
He calls both worlds to Quran by prays
V
The English mind knows God's Food Law Rules
A long tale serves no service in a sense
A paradise lies for the pious alone
VI
This dervesh knows not a style in speech

See also 
 Index of Muhammad Iqbal–related articles
 Madani–Iqbal debate

Notes

External links
Read online

Iqbal Academy Pakistan

1938 books
Books by Muhammad Iqbal
Persian poems
Islamic philosophical poetry books
Poetry by Muhammad Iqbal
Poetry collections